Metameur is a Berber village with around 1500 inhabitants in the south of Tunisia located near Medenine. Metameur lies in a slightly elevated area about 100 m above sea level. d. M. about 7 km (route) northwest of Medenine.

Metameur was founded around the 14th century.

See also 

 List of cities in Tunisia
 Medenine

References 

Medenine Governorate
Communes of Tunisia